Pensana Saltend is a future processing facility for rare earth metals at Salt End, near Hull in the East Riding of Yorkshire, England. When operating at capability, the plant aims to produce 5% of world demand for neodymium and praseodymium oxide. Work on the site started in 2021, with full opening by 2023. The facility will be the first of its kind in Europe.

History
The facility will process rare earths from Angola in Africa, for downstream use in cars, phones, and wind turbines. In September 2021, Pensana confirmed a 25-year lease on the site at Saltend, with a view to providing between 100 and 125 permanent jobs at the plant by 2024. By the time of its operating capability, the plant is aiming to produce  of neodymium and praseodymium oxide per year; about 5% of global demand by 2025.

As most rare earth metals are processed in China, the facility would be the first of its kind in Europe. The site is located with the Humber Freeport, which launched in October 2021. The intent is that 100% of power for the facility will come from the Dogger Bank Wind Farm via a direct link. The plant is seen as part of a growing concern regarding the supply of the minerals necessary for electric car batteries and wind turbines, as part of a de-carbonised economy. However, with China de-carbonising their industries, it is thought that rare earth metals will be subject to supply issues.

Pensana was formed in 2006, and Besides their future mining operations in Angola, Pensana are also mining for rare earths in Gabon. Pensana claim that their mining and quarrying processes are 'greener' than other mining companies.

The application also sought to allow for the storage of hydrochloric acid, sodium hydroxide and oxalic acid.

References

Manufacturing plants in England
Industrial buildings in England
Buildings and structures in the East Riding of Yorkshire